Everyman Cinema may refer to:

Everyman Cinemas
Everyman Cinema, Hampstead
Everyman Cinema, Muswell Hill